The Panzerkampfwagen III/IV (PzKpfw III/IV) was an experimental medium tank project undertaken by Germany during World War II. The tank was designed to use components of both the Panzer III and Panzer IV, in an attempt to integrate the two projects.
The project was cancelled with only the blueprints developed, and no units were ever built.

Development
Due to the technical construction of the Panzer III and Panzer IV having strong similarities, in September 1941 there was consideration to create a new tank based on the chassis of the two tanks to create a perfectly uniform vehicle. By having uniform designs, it was anticipated that there would be cost reductions in production, supply, training and maintenance.

On 4 January 1944, the Panzerkomission approved of the PzKpfw III/IV, with a combination of the PzKpfw III and PzKpfw IV chassis. The Maybach HL-120TRM was selected as the engine for this new project, and was connected to the SSG-77 transmission. The most striking change was the use of a box drive with large wheels, with a hydraulic pivoting device tower. The vehicle was designed to be equipped with 50mm armour all-round, with 60mm thick armor plates on the front part of the body having a 60 degree vertical inclination on the top and 45 degrees vertical inclination at the bottom. Driving wheels of the PzKpfw III were used with the addition of reinforced output shafts, along with 540mm wide symmetrical tracks with a central ridge. The chassis had six semi-detached rollers 660mm in diameter on the leaf springs. The turret used was a modified variant of the PzKpfw IV Ausf. J, and used flexible electrical cable instead of using rotary electrical contacts at the base. The traverse angle of the turret was limited to 270 left and right longitudinally.

Full production of the vehicle was planned to commence in June 1944 at Krupp-Grusonverk, however on 12 July 1944, the PzKpfw III/IV project was cancelled because the vehicle did not meet the new requirements for armament capability and armor protection as a result of Soviet tanks encountered on the Eastern Front.

Tanks of comparable role, performance and era

 Medium Tank M7

References

World War II tanks of Germany
Medium tanks of Germany
World War II medium tanks